Mohammad Gul may refer to:
 Mohammad Gul (Helmand Council), elected to the Provincial Council in Helmand Province
 Mohammad Gul (Guantanamo captive 457), Afghan sent to Guantanamo
 Mohammed Gul (Taliban leader), Pakistani from Waziristan alleged to have ties to the Taliban

See also
 Gul Mohammad, Pakistani cricketer
 Gul Mohammed, said to have been the shortest man in the world